Mirko Zanni (born October 16, 1997) is an Italian weightlifter who competes in the men's –69 kg division. He won the bronze medal in the men's 67 kg event at the 2020 Summer Olympics held in Tokyo, Japan.

Career 
Zanni's first European competition was the 2012 European Youth Championships held in Bucharest, competing in the –62 kg category. He finished last overall, lifting a total of 194 kg.

In 2014, Zanni competed in the European Youth Championships, held in Ciechanów. He received a gold medal in the clean & jerk and won silver overall with a total lift of 253 kg. Later that year, he earned bronze at the Nanjing 2014 Summer Youth Olympics.

Zanni participated in the 2016 European Junior Weightlifting Championships. Having moved up to the –69 kg category, he finished in a silver medal position overall, achieving a 142 kg lift in the snatch and 167 kg in the clean & jerk — giving him a total of 309 kg.

References

External links
 

Italian male weightlifters
1997 births
Living people
Weightlifters at the 2014 Summer Youth Olympics
People from Pordenone
Weightlifters of Gruppo Sportivo Esercito
Mediterranean Games gold medalists for Italy
Mediterranean Games silver medalists for Italy
Mediterranean Games bronze medalists for Italy
Mediterranean Games medalists in weightlifting
Competitors at the 2018 Mediterranean Games
Competitors at the 2022 Mediterranean Games
European Weightlifting Championships medalists
Weightlifters at the 2020 Summer Olympics
Medalists at the 2020 Summer Olympics
Olympic medalists in weightlifting
Olympic bronze medalists for Italy
Sportspeople from Friuli-Venezia Giulia
21st-century Italian people
Olympic weightlifters of Italy